The Miniatur Wunderland (German for "Miniature Wonderland") is according to Guinness World Records, the largest model railway system in the world. It is located at the historic Speicherstadt in Hamburg, Germany.

The exhibition includes around 1,120 digitally controlled trains with more than 10,000 wagons. The Wonderland is also designed with around 4,300 houses and bridges, more than 10,000 vehicles - of which around 350 drive independently on the installation - 52 airplanes and around 290,000 figures. In terms of lighting technology, the system has a recurring day-night cycle and almost 500,000 built-in LED lights. Planning is also in progress for the construction of sections for Central America and the Caribbean, Asia, England, Africa and The Netherlands.

Prehistory 
In the summer of 2000, Frederik Braun, one of the two founders of Miniatur Wunderland, was on vacation in Zurich. In a local model train store he came up with the idea for the world's largest model railway. Back in Hamburg he searched for email addresses online and started a survey on the popularity of real and fictional sights of the city. In the process, the Miniatur Wunderland, which did not yet exist, was ranked 3 by male respondents.

According to the twin brothers Gerrit and Frederik Braun, the idea for Miniatur Wunderland, including the business plan, fitted on just two pages. The financial backer was Hamburger Sparkasse.

Construction and expansion 
After construction began in December 2000, the first three sections (Knuffingen, Central Germany and Austria) opened on 16 August 2001. Since then, new sections have been added. With the completion of the Hamburg, German Coast section in November 2002, Wunderland became the largest model railroad in Europe. Expansions in December 2003 with the United States and with Scandinavia in July 2005 followed. On 10 September 2015 Gerrit and Frederik Braun added the missing piece of track between the Switzerland section and a new Italy section. In doing so, they extended the track length from 13,000 to 15,400 meters. This was recorded by a Guinness judge, who then presented the certificate for the newly established world record. The 190 sq m  Bella Italia section was opened on 28 September 2016 after four years under construction, involving 180,000 man hours and costing around four million euros. Work on the Monaco / Provence section started in August 2019 and, when completed, will mean the addition of another 315 meters. The total length of currently 15,715 meters therefore corresponds to 1,367.21 km in real length, so this is now also the largest model railway layout in the world across all scales.

Sections 

The next stage under construction is Monaco (with the Formula 1 circuit). After its completion, work on South America will be started. The new section is to be built by the end of 2021 in a neighbouring building. A bridge built on 15 July 2020 will lead to it.

Other projects include Central America/Caribbean and Asia.

System 

Visitors walk back and forth between different rooms in a long corridor. Trains run along the walls of the rooms and on peninsula-like protrusions. The layout consists (as of September 2016) of nine completed sections of 60 to 300 m2 Model area:
 The first three sections were created simultaneously. They show central and southern Germany with the Harz mountains,  it also has a long ICE-high speed train track.
 The fictional town of Knuffingen was given a road system with moving cars as a special feature.
 The Austria section involved the implementation of the Alps theme, including a multi-level helix from which trains from the other sections change corridor sides above the heads of visitors.
 The next stage of expansion includes the section with the theme Hamburg, German Coast.
 The United States section includes Las Vegas, Miami, some Wild West, again a system with moving cars and a spaceport.
 The Scandinavia section has a real water area: in the future, computer-controlled ships will operate in the 30,000 liter "North Sea" sea tub. At present, they are still controlled manually. Tides are also simulated here.
 The Swiss Alps, extending over two floors, are modeled on the landscapes of the cantons of Ticino, Grisons and Wallis and were completed in November 2007. Through a hole in the ceiling on a total area of 100 m2 the mountains reach almost six meters in height. Visitors reach this new level via stairs, while trains negotiate the height differences in concealed switchbacks and in a locomotive lift.
 The Knuffingen Airport section was opened in May 2011 after around six years in construction and development and an investment of 3.5 million euros. On display is a 150 m2 airport with a globally unique airport control system.
 A small section forms the Hamburg HafenCity with the Elbphilharmonie concert hall. Planning began in May 2012 and construction began in August the same year. A total of nine square meters (m2) were available, and 10 selected houses were built on this area. The opening was on 13 November 2013.
 In 2014, a trip was made to Italy to gain lots of impressions of the country. These were brought into the 9th construction section Italy. In this section, some sights of Rome as well as landscapes like Tuscany or the lava-spewing Vesuvius can be seen. The construction section was presented in a specially created blog and opened in September 2016.
 In February 2018, the Venice section was opened at only 9 m2 in size. Involving around 35,000 man hours, it is the most elaborate section – in relation to its size.

Special features 

Special features include a simulated daily routine where twilight, night and day repeat every 15 minutes. This includes an automatic lighting control system that activates more than 300,000 lights to match the time of day.

The 120-square-meter fantasy town of Knuffingen, with a population of about 6,000, is equipped with more than 100 moving model cars, including numerous fire engines, which are used to simulate a firefighting operation in Knuffingen every 15 minutes on average. Traffic simulation is made possible by a modified car system that is also used in the USA, Scandinavia and Knuffingen Airport sections. In the America section, even an Interstate Highway is equipped with a dynamic Traffic Control System, which uses variable-message signs with 2x16 characters, lane use control lights, and 4 different speed limits to control traffic.

The layout is considered to be rich in detail, examples include a changing scoreboard in the Volkspark Stadium or a crashed cheese wheel truck. There is also a Jet gas station there, displaying the real current gasoline prices of its prototype in Hamburg's Amsinck street.

Visitors can control operations on the system through ca. 200 pushbuttons. These buttons are highlights for many visitors. For example, a mine train starts, wind turbines turn, the next goal falls in the football stadium, a Space Shuttle takes off, a helicopter takes off or Pinocchio's nose begins to grow. A push button even allows visitors to watch the simulated production of a small bar of chocolate in a factory and taste the real product for themselves.

Certain tours also include a behind-the-scenes look at detailed figures that cannot be seen from the normal public area.

Knuffingen Airport 
 
After six years in planning and under construction, Knuffingen airport was officially opened to visitors on 4 May 2011, as a special section of the facility. Its buildings resemble  Hamburg Airport. As in the fictional main town of Knuffingen, there is also a simulation of a fire department with a large fleet of vehicles, including four airfield fire engines. On the 14 meter long runway, aircraft models can be accelerated to scale realistically on an invisible sled, and by means of two guide rods can also seemingly lift off the ground and disappear into a (cloud) wall. Depending on the launch phase, the guide rods allow a horizontal tilt of the aircraft that approximates reality.

There is also a wide variety of standard commercial aircraft including Boeing 747 and Airbus A380 in the liveries of many airlines around the world. Even models of the still relatively new Airbus A350 and Boeing 787 "Dreamliner" aircraft take off and land at Knuffingen. There is also a Concorde in British Airways livery, a Space Shuttle, a bee and the "Millennium Falcon" spaceship known from Star Wars.

The movement of the aircraft on the ground is realized with the help of technology based on the car system. The vehicles in the airport tell their own little stories with coordinated refueling, loading and unloading before and after landing starting from the aircraft parking positions.

Unlike the other landscapes, the railroad at the airport is hardly visible. There is only an airport station underground.

According to the operators, the 150-square-meter space has cost around 3.5 million euros, in addition to 150,000 man hours. The area is equipped not only with many rolling aircraft models, but also with hundreds of cars, passenger boarding bridges, parking garages, airport hotels, a subway and individual figures.

Visitors 
On 5 December 2012 the ten-millionth visitor came to Miniatur Wunderland, on 2 December 2016 the fifteen-millionth. Around three quarters of visitors come from Germany, the remaining quarter from abroad, mainly from Denmark, Switzerland, Austria, England, the US and China.

Awards 
In 2010, company founders Frederik and Gerrit Braun and Stephan Hertz were awarded the Cross of Merit on Ribbon of the Order of Merit of the Federal Republic of Germany for their social commitment. The Miniatur Wunderland also holds the Guinness World Record for "Longest melody played by a model train."

Presence in the media 
Several times following completion of the various expansion stages, the Hamburg section was visited by a team of reporters from Eisenbahn-Romantik from SWR. They were also give a look behind the scenes. Numerous television stations, magazines and newspapers have already reported on Miniatur Wunderland.

In May 2009, rapper Samy Deluxe filmed the video clip for his socially critical song Stumm in Miniatur Wunderland. Within just one night, about 100 sequences were recorded in which a miniature figure "runs" (stop-motion) through the layout.

On 5 December 2009 the outdoor betting section of the German television show Wetten, dass..? took place at Miniatur Wunderland.

The plot of several episodes of the Hamburg crime series Großstadtrevier took place at Miniatur Wunderland.

In 2015, together with singer Helene Fischer, a campaign for Ein Herz für Kinder was launched, in which over 450,000 euros (as of 01/2016) were collected. The campaign was presented, among others, in the Ein Herz für Kinder Gala.

In January 2016, Miniatur Wunderland partnered with Google MiniView – a miniature version of Google Street View.

References

External links 

 
 

Tourist attractions in Hamburg
Model railroads
2000 establishments in Germany
Museums in Hamburg
Miniature parks